Toodles may refer to:

 Toodles Galore, a female cat in the Tom and Jerry cartoons
 Toodles, a female shih-tzu dog, appearing periodically in the television program The New Normal
 Toodles, a fictional device from the Mickey Mouse Clubhouse children's series

See also
 Tootles, one of Peter Pan's Lost Boys